The Solo technical routine competition at the 2017 World Championships was held on 14 and 15 July 2017.

Results
The preliminary round was started on 14 July at 11:00. The final was held on 15 July at 11:00.

Green denotes finalists

References

Solo technical routine